Missouri is home to a diversity of both flora and fauna. There is a large amount of fresh water present due to the Mississippi River, Missouri River, and Lake of the Ozarks, with numerous smaller tributary rivers, streams, and lakes. North of the Missouri River, the state is primarily rolling hills of the Great Plains, whereas south of the Missouri River, the state is dominated by the Oak-Hickory Central U.S. hardwood forest.

Some of the native species found in Missouri are included below.

Mammals

 Opossum
 Nine-banded armadillo
 Muskrat
 Beaver
 Eastern mole
 Little brown bat
 Big brown bat
 Mexican free-tailed bat
 Silver-haired bat
 Least shrew
 American short-tailed shrew
 Southern bog lemming
 Meadow vole
 Woodland vole
 Hispid pocket mouse
 Meadow jumping mouse
 Plains harvest mouse
 Deer mouse
 Hispid cotton rat
 Eastern woodrat
 Marsh rice rat
 Plains pocket gopher
 American red squirrel
 Southern flying squirrel
 Gray squirrel
 Eastern chipmunk
 Thirteen-lined ground squirrel
 Woodchuck
 Eastern cottontail
 Badger
 Raccoon
 Spotted skunk
 Striped skunk
 Long-tailed weasel
 American mink
 River otter
 Red fox
 Gray fox
 Coyote
 American black bear
 Cougar
 Bobcat
 White-tailed deer

Within historic times, pronghorn, gray wolf, and brown bear were all found in Missouri, but have since been eliminated. American bison and Elk were formerly common, but are currently confined to private farms and parks. Elk can be found in a small restoration zone in three counties in the Southeast Ozarks.

Birds

Year-round:

 Pied-billed grebe
 Great blue heron
 Canada goose
 Mallard
 Wood duck
 Killdeer
 Common snipe
 American woodcock
 Turkey vulture
 Red-tailed hawk
 Cooper's hawk
 Red-shouldered hawk
 American kestrel
 Northern harrier
 Northern bobwhite
 Wild turkey
 Ring-necked pheasant
 Rock dove
 Mourning dove
 Belted kingfisher
 Barn owl
 Barred owl
 Great horned owl
 Short-eared owl
 Long-eared owl
 Eastern screech owl
 Northern saw-whet owl
 Horned lark
 Common crow
 Blue jay
 Red-bellied woodpecker
 Red-headed woodpecker
 Pileated woodpecker
 Downy woodpecker
 Hairy woodpecker
 Northern flicker
 Black-capped chickadee
 Carolina chickadee
 White-breasted nuthatch
 Tufted titmouse
 Northern mockingbird
 Loggerhead shrike
 American robin
 Eastern bluebird
 Pine warbler
 Eastern meadowlark
 Red-winged blackbird
 European starling
 Common grackle
 Northern cardinal
 American goldfinch
 Eastern towhee
 Song sparrow
 Field sparrow
 House sparrow
 Carolina wren
 Bewick's wren
 Wood thrush
 Brown thrasher

Summer/breeders: 

 Green-backed heron
 Black-crowned night heron
 Yellow-crowned night heron
 Little blue heron
 American bittern
 Least bittern
 Great egret
 Cattle egret
 White ibis
 White-faced ibis
 Virginia rail
 King rail
 Spotted sandpiper
 Upland sandpiper
 Sora
 Common moorhen
 American coot
 Northern pintail
 Northern shoveler
 Blue-winged teal
 Hooded merganser
 Least tern
 Black tern
 Black vulture
 Mississippi kite
 Broad-winged hawk
 Sharp-shinned hawk
 Yellow-billed cuckoo
 Black-billed cuckoo
 Common nighthawk
 Chimney swift
 Ruby-throated hummingbird
 American white pelican
 Double-crested cormorant
 Chuck-will's-widow
 Whip-poor-will
 Eastern kingbird
 Scissor-tailed flycatcher
 Eastern phoebe
 Great crested flycatcher
 Eastern wood pewee
 Willow flycatcher
 Least flycatcher
 Acadian flycatcher
 Yellow-bellied flycatcher
 Scarlet tanager
 Summer tanager
 Barn swallow
 Tree swallow
 Bank swallow
 Northern rough-winged swallow
 Cliff swallow
 Purple martin
 House wren
 Carolina wren
 Gray catbird
 Brown thrasher
 Wood thrush
 Warbling vireo
 Red-eyed vireo
 Yellow-throated vireo
 Bell's vireo
 Black and white warbler
 Prothonotary warbler
 Blue-winged warbler
 Northern parula
 Cerulean warbler
 Prairie warbler
 Pine warbler
 Yellow warbler
 Yellow-throated warbler
 Kentucky warbler
 Hooded warbler
 Hooded warbler
 Worm-eating warbler
 Louisiana waterthrush
 Ovenbird
 American redstart
 Baltimore oriole
 Orchard oriole
 Northern oriole
 Common yellowthroat
 Yellow-breasted chat
 Bobolink
 Yellow-headed blackbird
 Brown-headed cowbird
 Blue grosbeak
 Indigo bunting
 Painted bunting
 Rose-breasted grosbeak
 Black-headed grosbeak
 Grasshopper sparrow
 Savannah sparrow
 Lark sparrow
 Chipping sparrow
 Henslow's sparrow
 Vesper sparrow
 Fish crow
 House wren
 Marsh wren
 Sedge wren
 Blue-gray gnatcatcher
 Dickcissel

Winter residents: 

 Green-winged teal
 Black duck
 Gadwall
 Ruddy duck
 Canvasback
 Redhead
 Ring-necked duck
 Lesser scaup
 Bufflehead
 Common goldeneye
 American herring gull
 Ring-billed gull
 Bald eagle
 Golden eagle
 Rough-legged hawk
 Merlin
 Ruffed grouse
 Greater prairie chicken
 Brown creeper
 Red-breasted nuthatch
 Winter wren
 Hermit thrush
 Yellow-bellied sapsucker
 Cedar waxwing
 Golden-crowned kinglet
 American tree sparrow
 American pipit
 Dark-eyed junco
 Purple finch
 Evening grosbeak
 Red crossbill
 White-throated sparrow
 White-crowned sparrow
 Fox sparrow
 Swamp sparrow
 Cedar waxwing
 Lapland longspur
 Snow bunting
 Rusty blackbird
 Brewer's blackbird
 Pine siskin

Within historic times, the passenger pigeon, the carolina parakeet, and the ivory-billed woodpecker were all found in Missouri, but they have since been eliminated.

Reptiles

Reptiles of Missouri include: 

 Alligator snapping turtle
 Snapping turtle
 Stinkpot
 Eastern mud turtle
 Northern map turtle
 False map turtle
 Eastern box turtle
 Western box turtle
 Painted turtle
 Blanding's turtle
 Red-eared slider
 Chicken turtle
 Smooth softshell turtle
 Spiny softshell turtle
 Collared lizard
 Texas horned lizard
 Eastern fence lizard
 Coal skink
 Broadhead skink
 Ground skink
 Five-lined skink
 Six-lined racerunner
 Slender glass lizard
 Western worm snake
 Black racer
 Ringneck snake
 Scarlet snake
 Mud snake
 Corn snake
 Rat snake
 Fox snake
 Milk snake
 Eastern hognose snake
 Common kingsnake
 Coachwhip
 Smooth green snake
 Northern water snake
 Diamondback water snake
 Plain-bellied water snake
 Bullsnake
 Graham's crayfish snake
 Common garter snake
 Cottonmouth
 Copperhead
 Western pygmy rattlesnake
 Timber rattlesnake
 Massasauga

Amphibians

Amphibians of Missouri include:

 Common Mudpuppy
 Western Lesser siren
 Hellbender
 Spotted salamander
 Marbled salamander
 Eastern Tiger salamander
 Dusky salamander
 Long-tailed salamander
 Red-backed salamander
 Four-toed salamander
 Ringed salamander
 Mole salamander
 Small-mouthed salamander
 Central newt
 Three-toed amphiuma
 Cave salamander
 Grotto salamander
 Gray-bellied salamander
 Western Slimy salamander
 Ozark Zigzag salamander
 Southern Red-backed salamander
 Eastern spadefoot toad
 Plains spadefoot toad
 Fowler's toad
 Great Plains toad
 Common toad
 Woodhouse's toad
 Eastern American toad
 Eastern narrow-mouthed toad
 Great Plains narrow-mouthed toad
 Striped chorus frog
 Illinois Chorus frog
 Upland chorus frog
 Northern Crawfish frog
 Blanchard's cricket frog
 Northern cricket frog
 Northern spring peeper
 Gray tree frog
 Green tree frog
 Green frog
 Bullfrog
 Pickerel frog
 Wood frog
 Northern leopard frog
 Southern leopard frog
 Plains leopard frog

Fish

 Lamprey
 Sturgeon
 Paddlefish
 Longnose gar
 Mooneye
 Bowfin
 Herring
 American eel
 Northern pike
 Rainbow trout
 Carp
 Fathead minnow
 Channel catfish
 Trout-perch
 Livebearer
 Striped bass
 Largemouth bass
 Bluegill
 Walleye
 Yellow perch

Molluscs

 Stagnant pond snail
 Eastern mystery snail
 Common tadpole snail
 Three-whorled ram's horn
 Pearl mussel
 Asiatic clam
 Filter mussel
 Striped forest snail
 White-lipped forest snail

Crustaceans

Big Creek crayfish
Shrimp crayfish
St. Francis River crayfish
Woodland crayfish

Insect migrations

There has also been a migration of insects from the south to Missouri.  One example of this is the wasp Polistes exclamans.

 01
F01
W01
W01
Missouri

See also 
 List of mammals of Missouri
 List of birds of Missouri
 Fauna of the United States
 List of Missouri Native Plants
 North American Prairies Province
 Appalachian Province
 Atlantic and Gulf Coastal Plain Province
 List of Missouri Native Plants
 Missouri Conservationist

References